Harbin North railway station is a railway station of Harbin–Qiqihar Intercity Railway and located in Harbin, Heilongjiang Province, China. The station was opened in 2015 with both conventional rail and high-speed rail services.

The station is the closest railway station to Harbin's Hulan University town and the renowned Harbin International Ice and Snow Sculpture Festival.

Metro station
Line 2 of Harbin Metro opened on September 19, 2021.

References 

Railway stations in Harbin
Railway stations in China opened in 2015
Stations on the Harbin–Qiqihar Intercity Railway